The 2006 Basque Pelota World Championships were the 15th edition of the Basque Pelota World Championships organized by  the FIPV.

Participating nations

Events
A total of 14 events were disputed, in 4 playing areas.

Trinquete, 6 events disputed

Fronton (30 m), 3 events disputed

Fronton (36 m), 4 events disputed

Fronton (54 m), 1 event disputed

Medal table

References

Basque pelota competitions in Mexico
2006 in sports
Sport in Mexico City
International sports competitions hosted by Mexico
2006 in Mexican sports
2006 in basque pelota